Great Cheverell Hill is a 33.2 hectare biological Site of Special Scientific Interest at Great Cheverell in Wiltshire, notified in 1971.

The site consists of unimproved species-rich chalk grassland on the edge of Salisbury Plain, parts of it with over forty plant species per square metre, and supports some uncommon butterflies. Its slopes of the Lower Chalk mostly face south-west, and there are two combes. The sward is notable for upright brome (Bromus erectus) and sheep's fescue (Festuca ovina). Other plants include quaking grass! crested hair-grass, Bird's-foot-trefoil, dwarf thistle, small scabious (Scabiosa columbaria) and hoary plantain (Plantago media).

Sources

 Natural England citation sheet for the site (accessed 1 April 2022)

External links
 Natural England website (SSSI information)

Sites of Special Scientific Interest in Wiltshire
Sites of Special Scientific Interest notified in 1971